Parc Olympique Lyonnais, known for sponsorship reasons as Groupama Stadium, is a 59,186-seat stadium in Décines-Charpieu, in the Lyon Metropolis. The home of French football club Olympique Lyonnais, it replaced their previous stadium, Stade de Gerland, in January 2016.

The stadium was a host of UEFA Euro 2016, and was also chosen to stage the 2017 Coupe de la Ligue Final and the 2018 UEFA Europa League Final, in addition to the 2019 FIFA Women's World Cup and football at the 2024 Summer Olympics in Paris. Outside football, the ground has also held rugby union and ice hockey matches, as well as musical concerts.

Construction
On 1 September 2008, Olympique Lyonnais president Jean-Michel Aulas announced plans to create a new 60,000-seat stadium, tentatively called OL Land, to be built on 50 hectares of land located in Décines-Charpieu, a suburb of Lyon. The stadium would also include state-of-the-art sporting facilities, two hotels, a leisure center, and commercial and business offices.

On 13 October 2008, the project was agreed upon by the French government, the General Council of Rhône, the Grand Lyon, SYTRAL, and the commune of Décines for construction with approximately €180 million of public money being used and between €60–80 million coming from the Urban Community of Lyon. The project was hindered by slow administrative procedures, political interests, and various opposition groups who viewed the stadium as financially, ecologically, and socially wrong for the taxpayers and community of Décines. After landscaping in 2012, stadium construction started in summer 2013.

Football
Olympique Lyonnais played their first game in the new stadium on 9 January 2016, winning 4–1 against Troyes in Ligue 1; Alexandre Lacazette scored the first goal at the ground.

In November 2009, the French Football Federation chose Parc Olympique Lyonnais one of the twelve stadiums to be used in the country's bidding for UEFA Euro 2016. It hosted six games at the tournament, including the hosts' 2–1 win over the Republic of Ireland in the last 16, and eventual champions Portugal's 2–0 win over Wales in the semi-finals.

In September 2016, the new stadium was chosen as the host of the 2017 Coupe de la Ligue Final, the first time that the final had been hosted outside the Paris area. Paris Saint-Germain won 4–1 against Monaco. On 9 December 2016, UEFA announced that Parc OL had been chosen to host the 2018 UEFA Europa League Final  on 16 May 2018.

Parc OL was one of nine stadiums hosting matches at the 2019 FIFA Women's World Cup, staging the semi-finals and the final. It will also be a venue for football at the 2024 Summer Olympics.

UEFA Euro 2016

2019 FIFA Women's World Cup

2023 Rugby World Cup

France national football team

Other uses
The venue hosted an outdoor Ligue Magnus ice hockey game between Lyon and Grenoble on 30 December 2016. In that game, Grenoble defeated Lyon 5–2; the attendance at that game was 25,142, which turned out to be the all-time record attendance for an ice hockey game in France.

Parc Olympique Lyonnais hosted the finals of rugby union's European Rugby Champions Cup and European Rugby Challenge Cup in 2016. It is one of nine venues chosen for France's hosting of the 2023 Rugby World Cup.

The stadium has hosted several musical performances, the first being by American singer will.i.am after the inaugural match on 9 January 2016. Other acts who have played there include Christophe Maé, Rihanna, Coldplay, Ed Sheeran, Phil Collins, Céline Dion, Rammstein, Red Hot Chili Peppers and The Rolling Stones.

References

External links

Groupama Stadium

Football venues in France
Rugby union stadiums in France
Rugby World Cup stadiums
Outdoor ice hockey venues
Olympique Lyonnais
UEFA Euro 2016 stadiums
Sports venues completed in 2016
2019 FIFA Women's World Cup stadiums
Olympic football venues
Venues of the 2024 Summer Olympics
Sports venues in Lyon Metropolis
21st-century architecture in France